The Defenders are a loosely organized team of fictional characters mostly, but not solely, superheroes in the Marvel Universe. For much of their history, there was no official membership. Thus, the Defenders had a reputation as being a non-team, a term which was coined in the pages of the comic. All could be considered Defenders. The following list attempts to make sense of their membership but may not be complete.

Original "non-team"

Founders 
These characters helped form the team in Marvel Features #1 (December 1971).

Recruits of the early 1970s

Recruits of the mid-1970s

Defenders for a day 

The team had managed to keep its existence a secret from the general public until a television documentary film by supporting character Dollar Bill announced it to the world. Dollar made a special mention to the currently open membership for the team. Consequently, in Defenders #62 (August 1978), the currently active members were joined by a large number of former associates and new recruits. The majority of the latter served for a single mission before quitting in Defenders #64 (October 1978).

 Black Goliath
 Captain Mar-Vell
 Captain Ultra
 Falcon
 Havok
 Hercules
 Iron Fist
 Jack of Hearts
 Marvel Man
 Ms. Marvel
 Nova
 Paladin
 Polaris
 Prowler
 Stingray
 Tagak the Leopard Lord
 Torpedo
 White Tiger

Rival group 

Taking advantage of the newfound notoriety of the team, a number of supervillains formed their own rival group of so-called Defenders in Defenders #63 (September 1978). They soon came to conflict with their heroic counterparts and consequently disbanded in Defenders #64 (October 1978).

 Batroc the Leaper
 Beetle
 Blob
 Boomerang
 Cap'n Skragg
 Electro
 Joe the Gorilla
 Leap-Frog
 Libra
 Looter
 Melter
 Pecos
 Plantman
 Porcupine
 Sagittarius
 Shocker
 Toad
 Whirlwind

Early 1980s recruits

New Defenders 
In Defenders #125 (November 1983) the team was reorganized into a more formal organization, somewhat modeled after the Avengers. By this time, several former members had severed ties with the team.

Founders

Later recruits

Dragon Circle 
By the time of Defenders #152 (February 1986), Moondragon had fallen under the control of the Dragon of the Moon. The Dragon led her to attack the Defenders. During the battle, the physical forms of Andromeda, Gargoyle, Interloper, Manslaughter, Moondragon, and Valkyrie were destroyed. Candace Southern retired. Angel, Beast, and Iceman were joined by Cyclops and Marvel Girl in forming X-Factor.

Gargoyle and Moondragon were later able to gain new corporeal forms. However the other four remained disembodied spirits until Doctor Strange, Sorcerer Supreme vol 3 #3–4 (March–April 1989). There they managed to gain temporary but recurring spiritual possession  over the bodies of four residents of Swansea, Wales, United Kingdom. These four unknowingly acted as their representatives in forming a successor group of the Defenders.

 Sian Bowen: Host to the spirit of Valkyrie.
 Geneviene Cass: Host to the spirit of Andromeda.
 Will Fanshawe: Host to the spirit of Interloper.
 Roger Loomis: Host to the spirit of Manslaughter.
 Dafydd ap Iowerth: Alleged descendant of King Arthur and host to his spirit.
 Doctor Strange: Associate member.

Secret Defenders 
Debuting in Dr. Strange (vol. 3) #50 (February 1993) the Secret Defenders were another successor group to the team. They were very loosely organized, consisting of a leader and the various associates recruited for a mission at hand. They would disband again after each mission. Several "members" were former Defenders. Others had no previous connection to the team. Some served for a single mission while others were recurring members.

Founders

Early recruits

Questing villains
From Secret Defenders #12-14 (February and April), the title of characters was an organized group of super-villains that was in the quest of finding and obtaining the Oracle of Ancient Knowledge. They apparently disbanded after the successful mission.

 Thanos: The leader and recruiter of this group.
 Geatar
 Nitro
 Rhino
 Super-Skrull
 Titanium Man

Final recruits 
By Secret Defenders #15 (May 1994), Doctor Strange's duties and circumstances required him elsewhere. He retired after naming Doctor Druid as his replacement. The latter would serve as leader until the group disbanded in Secret Defenders #25 (March 1995).

Note 
Before and during the initial few months of publication of Secret Defenders, an advertisement that Marvel used depicted a team consisting of Doctor Strange, Ghost Rider, John Blaze, Maverick, and Wolverine, a team which never existed in the comics. Neither John Blaze nor Maverick were ever part of a Secret Defenders team in any published story.

Cursed members and The Order 
In Defenders (vol. 2) #1 (March 2001), four former Defenders were forced to regroup to help Nighthawk and Hellcat in a battle against Yandroth. He was defeated but cursed them to gather every time planet Earth faces a threat. This continued until Defenders (vol. 2) #12 (February 2002). Four members of the team formed The Order. This group attempted to conquer the world in order to protect it. Its activities were featured in The Order #1-6 (April–September 2002). The group disbanded again after Gaia lifted Yandroth's curse which was associated with her.

Founders

Recruits

Recruits against The Order 
This incarnation of the Defenders was divided among two rival groups. 
The Order (Doctor Strange, the Hulk, Namor the Sub-Mariner, and the Silver Surfer) and the Defenders (Hellcat, Nighthawk, and Valkyrie). The three decided to recruit the so-called "female analogs" of their former teammates. They would serve until both teams disbanded.

Initiative Team (Last Defenders) 
Kyle Richmond requested an Initiative version of the Defenders from Tony Stark, intending to fill the ranks with previous Defenders including Gargoyle, Hellcat, and Devil Slayer. However, Stark assembled an entirely different team in hopes of the Defenders maintaining a stable roster for once. The team was officially disbanded after its first mission was deemed a failure.

Founders

Last Defenders recruits 
After the Initiative team disbands, Richmond attempts to continue by hiring registered mercenaries to replace the teammates that Stark had assigned to him. After he was forced to retire from his superhero career, he privately assembles and supports a version of the Defenders based on an encounter with a future version of that team. This team is later forcibly disbanded by H.A.M.M.E.R.

Fear Itself: The Deep's Defenders
This incarnation of the Defenders was formed during the Fear Itself storyline in order to liberate Atlantis from Attuma (in the form of Nerkodd: Breaker of Oceans).

Defenders Vol. 4
The Defenders came together again when it comes to keeping the Concordance Engine from falling into the wrong hands.

Fearless Defenders

Defenders Vol. 5
A new, street-level team calling themselves the Defenders form to stop crime. This team is based on the Netflix version of the team.

Defenders Vol. 6

Defenders Beyond

Marvel Cinematic Universe
Members of "The Defenders" appear in the Marvel Cinematic Universe television series Marvel's The Defenders. Each of the Defenders listed below have an individual series all leading up to the miniseries

References 

Defenders